The Goodwood Trophy Race was a Formula One motor race held at the inaugural meeting at Goodwood Circuit, West Sussex on 18 September 1948. The race was held over five laps and was won by Reg Parnell in a Maserati 4CLT/48. ERA drivers Bob Gerard and David Hampshire were second and third, with Gerard setting fastest lap.

Classification

Race

1Grid places determined by ballot.

References

Goodwood Trophy
Goodwood Trophy
1948 in English sport